José Francisco Morazán Quesada (born October 3, 1792 – September 15, 1842) was a liberal Central American politician who served as president of the Federal Republic of Central America from 1830 to 1839. Before he was president of Central America he was the head of state of Honduras. He rose to prominence at the Battle of La Trinidad on November 11, 1827. Morazán then dominated the political and military scene of Central America until his execution in 1842.

In the political arena, Francisco Morazán was recognized as a visionary and great thinker, as he attempted to transform Central America into one large and progressive nation. He enacted liberal reforms in the new Federal Republic of Central America, including freedom of the press, freedom of speech and freedom of religion.  Morazán also limited church power by making marriage secular and abolishing government-aided tithing.

These reforms made him some powerful enemies, and his period of rule was marked by bitter infighting between liberals and conservatives. But through his military skills, Morazán was able to keep a firm  grip on power until 1837, when the Federal Republic became irrevocably fractured. This was exploited by the conservative leaders, who rallied around the leadership of Rafael Carrera and in order to protect their own interests, ended up dividing Central America into five nations.

Personal life

Early years and education 
José Francisco Morazán Quesada was born on October 3, 1792, in Tegucigalpa (then in the Captaincy General of Guatemala, now the capital of Honduras) during the waning years of Spanish colonial rule to Eusebio Morazán Alemán and Guadalupe Quesada Borjas, both members of an upper-class Creole family dedicated to trade and agriculture. His grandparents were Juan Bautista Morazán (a Corsican immigrant) and María Borjas Alvarenga. Thirteen days after his birth Morazán was baptized at San Miguel Arcángel church, by father Juan Francisco Márquez.

Francisco Morazán was, for the most part, a self-educated man. According to historian Ramon Rosa; he "had the misfortune of being born ... in that sad era of isolation and total darkness in which Honduras lacked schools ... therefore Morazan had to learn in private schools with an awful organization and sustained by parents' contributions." In 1804, his parents took advantage of the opening of a Catholic school in the village of San Francisco. At the age of twelve, José Francisco was sent there to learn to write and read, and to receive instruction in mathematics and drawing. The teachings he received were through Friar Santiago Gabrielino, appointed religious instructor to the Guatemalan priest José Antonio Murga.

In 1808 Francisco Morazán and his family moved to Morocelí where they worked the fields inherited by Mr Eusebio. In addition, young José Francisco also engaged in helping the town's mayor with his clerk duties. In 1813 the family moved back to Tegucigalpa. Once there, Mr. Eusebio placed his son under the tutorship of Leon Vasquez who taught him civil law, criminal procedure and Notaries.

Francisco now had access to a library where he learned French, which in turn, allowed him to familiarize himself with the works of Montesquieu, the social contract of Jean-Jacques Rousseau, the French Revolution, the history of Europe, as well as the biographies of the Greek and Roman leaders. This dedication and spirit of improvement took Francisco to occasionally excel in his hometown, where he even represented the interest of some people before the colonial courts.

Marriage and family
Francisco Morazán married María Josefa Lastiri in the Cathedral of Comayagua on December 30, 1825. They had one daughter, Adela Morazán Lastiri, born in San Salvador in 1838. Lastiri belonged to one of the wealthiest families in province of Honduras. Her father was the Spanish trader Juan Miguel Lastiri, who played an important part in the commercial development of Tegucigalpa. Her mother was Margarita Lozano, member of a powerful Creole family in the city.

María Josefa was a widow who had first married the landowner Esteban Travieso, with whom she had 4 children. Upon his death, she inherited a fortune. Her fortune and the new circle of powerful and influential friends, that came out of this marriage only enhanced Morazán's own business, and thus his political and military projects.

Outside his marriage, Francisco Morazán fathered a son, Francisco Morazán Moncada, who was born on October 4, 1827, to Francisca Moncada, daughter of a well-known Nicaraguan politician named Liberato Moncada. Francisco Morazán Junior lived in the Morazán-Lastiri home and accompanied his father in Guatemala, El Salvador, Panama, Peru and finally in Costa Rica, where his father was executed. After the death of his father, Francisco Morazán Moncada settled in Chinandega, Nicaragua where he devoted himself to farming. He died in 1904 at age 77.

Morazán also had an adoptive son named José Antonio Ruiz. He was the legitimate son of Eusebio Ruiz and the Guatemalan lady Rita Zelayandía, who handed her son to General Morazán when he was 14 years old. José Antonio accompanied his adoptive father on military actions and became a brigadier general. He died in Tegucigalpa in 1883.

Early political and military career
After the Captaincy General of Guatemala, which included Honduras, became independent from Spain (on September 15, 1821) Francisco Morazán began to take an active part in politics and public administration. He worked at Tegucigalpa's City Hall as deputy mayor and public defender in  civil and criminal court cases. Such activities allowed him to acquire a great knowledge of the structure and operation of the public administration of the province. This job also allowed him to get in close contact with the problems of post-colonial society.

In November 1821, shortly after the Captaincy had declared its independence from Spain, a group of dignitaries and politicians known as the 'Interim Advisory Board' sat in Guatemala City in the process of organizing a government to succeed Spanish colonial rule. On November 18, a note from General Agustín de Iturbide arrived in Guatemala City suggesting a union between the Captaincy and the Mexican Empire, pursuant to the Plan of Iguala and the Treaty of Córdoba. The members of the Interim Advisory Board, after reviewing the issue, stated they were not empowered nor deputized to decide on this matter, but suggested forums be held in different cities to hear the views of the people, and thus explore their willingness to go forward with the proposal. The question of annexation to Mexico caused divisions within each of the provinces as some cities were in favor and others against. In Honduras, Comayagua, through its Governor José Tinoco de Contreras, supported the idea of the annexation. But Tegucigalpa, the second most important city of the province, strongly opposed it. Tinoco then decided to take repressive actions against the authorities of that city.

In order to offset Tinoco's aggressiveness and to defend their independence, an army of volunteers organized in Tegucigalpa. It was during these events, that Francisco Morazán enlisted as a volunteer at the service of the authorities in Tegucigalpa. He was appointed captain of one of the companies, by decision of the organizers of the militias. Thus began Morazán's military life and his struggle against conservative interests.

Tegucigalpa could not maintain its opposition, however, and recognized its annexation to Mexico on August 22, 1822. The annexation to the Mexican Empire was short-lived, with the collapse of the Mexican Empire and the subsequent creation of the Federal Republic of Central America on April 1, 1823. That same year, the Constituent Congress in Guatemala appointed Morazán as a member of a commission to study the affairs of the Federation. That same commission determined the electoral districts, district boards and the departmental boards of the Federal Republic. A year later Morazán's uncle Dionisio de Herrera, was elected Head of State  in Honduras. On September 28, 1824, he appointed Morazán as his secretary general.

Background of the Federal Republic

The Central American Federation (1824–38) comprised the republics of Central America—Costa Rica, Guatemala, Honduras, Nicaragua, and El Salvador. United under a captaincy general in Spanish colonial times, they gained independence in 1821 and were briefly annexed to the Mexican Empire formed by Agustín de Iturbide in 1822. On July 1, 1823, these nations regained their independence, and joined together in a loose federal state.

In the following year, the Constituent Congress of Central America met in Guatemala City, to decide which system of government to adopt for the young nation. In debates two different proposals emerged. The Liberal Party wanted a federalist government, similar to that of the United States of 1789. This type of government would provide every state significant autonomy of self-administration, freedom to create its own laws and reforms, among other things, but always under the supervision of the federal government, keeper of the constitution.

The Conservatives on the other hand, wanted a centralist government. In this system, the decisions and laws adopted by the central government would apply equally to all the other states. After debating the proposals, the Liberal majority prevailed, and the federalist system was adopted. On November 22, 1824, under the motto: "God, Union, Liberty", the new constitution was approved, and the nation was renamed the Federal Republic of Central America, appointing Manuel José Arce (1825–29) as the first president.

Rise to power

Battle of 'La Trinidad'

In 1826, the Federal Government headed by Manuel José Arce attempted to dissolve the federal congress and called a meeting to be held in Cojutepeque, on October 10, 1826, to elect an extraordinary congress. This unconstitutional move was rejected by the Honduran head of state, Dionisio de Herrera. But President Arce did not recognize Herrera's authority, claiming that Herrera's provisional mandate had expired, and that he was in power illegitimately. For this reason, the National Assembly had called for new elections in Honduras, but Herrera had ignored this decree and remained in power. For these reasons, but under the guise of protecting Copán's tobacco plantations owned by the federal government, Arce decided to oust Herrera. This mission was entrusted to colonel Justo Milla, who on April 9, 1827, commanded 200 men and seized Comayagua (the state capital) capturing Herrera and sending him to a Guatemalan prison.

While Milla was busy consolidating power in Comayagua, Morazán escaped from the federal troops. He left the besieged capital in the company of colonels Remigio Díaz and José Antonio Márquez, with the purpose of getting reinforcements in Tegucigalpa. Their plan was to return, and to liberate the state capital. Upon their return from Tegucigalpa, his men clashed with Milla's forces on the ranch 'La Maradiaga'. This confrontation, had no major consequences for either side; Milla remained in charge of Honduras, and Morazán left for Ojojona where he was captured and transferred to Tegucigalpa by order of Major Ramón Anguiano.

But Francisco Morazán  managed to escape from his captors and left for La Unión, El Salvador, with the intention of emigrating to Mexico. In La Unión, he met Mariano Vidaurre, a special Salvadoran envoy to the government of Nicaragua. Vidaurre convinced him that, in that country, he could find the military support he needed to expel Milla from Honduran territory. He arrived in the city of Leon, Nicaragua, where he met with the commander-in-chief of the Nicaraguan armed forces, José Anacleto "Cleto" Ordóñez. For Morazán the meeting paid off; the Nicaraguan leader provided him with weapons and a contingent of 135 men. These men were joined by Colonel Zepeda's troops from El Salvador, and some columns of Honduran volunteers in Choluteca, Honduras.

When Justo Milla discovered the presence of Morazán in southern Honduras, he quickly moved his troops to Tegucigalpa, where he established his headquarters, meanwhile Morazán headed for Sabanagrande. At 9 am on a November 11, Morazán faced General Milla in the memorable battle of 'La Trinidad'. After five hours of intense fighting in a hill used by the Justo Milla forces, Morazan disguised a plan for attack at the flanks using the fresh and rested troops coming from El Salvador, at last moment the troop from El Salvador reached the hill and attacked the rear forces from Justo Milla, driving Milla's forces to the front shock army from Morazan. Milla's federal troops were crushed by Morazán's men. Milla and few of his officers survived and fled the scene of battle. Following this victory, Morazán marched to Comayagua where he was declared Honduras' new Chief of State.

Civil War
Following his victory at 'La Trinidad', Morazán emerged as the leader of the liberal movement and his military skills became known throughout Central America. For these reasons, Morazán received calls for help from liberals in El Salvador. As in Honduras, Salvadorans opposed the new congressmen and other government officials elected by the decree issued on October 10, 1826. They demanded their restitution, but President Manuel Arce argued that this move was necessary to re-establish the constitutional order. El Salvador responded by attempting to take-over the federal government through military force. President Arce, however, defeated the Salvadoran army in Arrazola on March 23, 1828. He then ordered 2,000 federal troops under the command of General Manuel de Arzu to occupy El Salvador. This event marked the beginning of the civil war.

Francisco Morazán accepted the challenge. He placed Diego Vigil as Honduras's new head of state and left for Texiguat, where he prepared the Salvadoran campaign. In April, 1828, Morazán headed to El Salvador with a force of 1,400 men. This group of militants, known as the "Army Protector of the Law", was composed of small groups of Hondurans, Nicaraguans, and Salvadorans, who brought their own tools of war; others had the support of Indians who served as infantry. Some volunteers continued his liberal convictions, others worked for a political leader, others simply hoped to get something for their efforts after the war ended. This was the combination of forces that joined Morazán in their fight against federal troops.

While the Salvadoran army battled the Federal forces in San Salvador, Morazán positioned himself in the eastern part of the state. On July 6, Morazán defeated Col. Vicente Dominguez's Federal troops at the 'El Gualcho' ranch in Nuevo Gualcho. In his memoirs, Morazán described the battle like this: "At 12 midnight I undertook my march... but the rain didn't let me turn the day, and I was forced to wait in El Gualcho.... At 3 o'clock in the morning, the rain stopped, I put two companies of hunters on the hill overlooking to the left of the ranch.... At 5 o'clock I learned the position occupied by the enemy.... I could not go back under these circumstances.... It was no longer possible to continue the march, without serious danger, a vast plain and the very presence of the enemy. Less I could defend myself in the ranch, placed under a height of more than 200 feet.... It was therefore necessary to accept the battle with all the advantages reached by the enemy.... I ordered the hunters to advance over the enemy to stop their movement.... While the force rose by a slope and narrow path, fire broke out.... But 175 inexperienced soldiers made impotent for quarter of an hour, the repeated attacks by the bulk of the enemy. The enthusiasm that produced in all the soldiers the heroism of these brave Hondurans, exceeded the number of the enemy. When the action became general on both sides, our right wing was forced to back down. And occupied the light artillery that supported it. But the reserve working on that side, re-established our line, recovered the artillery and ended the action.... The Salvadorans assistants... arrived in time to pursue the dispersed..." enemy soldiers.

Morazán kept on fighting around San Miguel, defeating every platoon dispatched by General Arzu from San Salvador. This prompted Arzu to leave Col. Montufar in charge of San Salvador and personally deal with Morazán. When the 'liberal caudillo' learned about this, he left for Honduras to recruit more troops. On September 20, Gen. Arzu was along the Lempa River with 500 men in pursuit of Morazán, when he learned that his forces had capitulated in Mejicanos. In the meantime,  Morazán returned to El Salvador with a respectable army. Arzu feigning illness returned to Guatemala, leaving his forces under the command of  lieutenant colonel Antonio de Aycinena. The colonel and his troops then marched towards Honduran territory, when they were intercepted by Morazán's men in San Antonio. On October 9 Aycinena was forced to surrender. With the capitulation of San Antonio, El Salvador was finally free of federal troops. On October 23, Morazán triumphantly entered the plaza of San Salvador. A few days later, he marched on Ahuachapán, to organize the army with which he intended to invade Guatemala.

Guatemala

In Ahuachapán Morazán made every effort to organize a large army. He asked the government of El Salvador to provide 4,000 men, but had to settle for 2,000. When he was in position to act in early 1829, he sent a division commanded by Juan Prem to enter Guatemalan territory and to take control of Chiquimula. The order was carried out by Prem in spite of the resistance offered by the enemy. Shortly after, Morazán placed a small force near Guatemala City under the command of Col. Gutierrez to force the enemy out of their trenches and to cause the defection of their troops. Col. Dominguez had left from Guatemala City with 600 infantrymen to attack Prem but he was informed about Gutierrez's small force. He changed his course of action and went after Gutierrez. This opportunity was seized by Prem who then moved from Zacapa and on to Dominguez's forces, defeating them on January 15, 1829. Prem then was ordered to march with 1400 men under his command to occupy the post of San José, near the capital city.

Meanwhile, the people of Antigua organized against the Guatemalan government and placed the department of Sacatepequez under Morazán's protection. This prompted Morazán to invade Guatemala with his 'Protector Army of the law'. Morazán situated his men in the village of Pinula near the capital city. Military operations on the capital began with small skirmishes in front of government fortifications. On February 15 one of Morazán's largest divisions under the command of Cayetano de la Cerda was defeated in Mixco by federal troops. Due to this defeat Morazán lifted the siege of the city and concentrated his forces in Antigua. A strong division of federal troops followed him from the capital under the command of Col. Pacheco, heading towards Sumpango and Tejar with the purpose of attacking Morazán in Antigua. But Pacheco spread his forces, leaving some of them in Sumpango. When he went into San Miguelito with a smaller army, he was beaten by Morazán. This incident raised the morale of Morazán's men once again.

After the victory of San Miguelito, Morazán's army grew larger when Guatemalan volunteers joined his ranks. On March 15 when Morazán was on his way to occupy his former positions, he was intercepted by Col. Prado's Federal troops at the 'Las Charcas' ranch. Morazán, with a superior position, crushed Prado's army. The battlefield was left full of dead bodies, prisoners and weapons, and Morazán moved on to recover his former positions in Pinula and Aceytuno, and to put Guatemala City under siege again.

General Verveer, plenipotentiary minister of the king of the Netherlands to the Central America Federation, attempted to mediate between the Government under siege and Morazán, but they could not reach an agreement. Military operations continued, with great success for the allied army. On April 12, Guatemala's Chief of State, Mariano Aycinena, capitulated and the next day the Central Plaza was occupied by Morazán's troops. Immediately thereafter President Arce, Mariano Aycinena, Mariano Beltranena, and all the officials who had had some role in the war were sent to prison. After these events, the General ran the country dictatorially, until senator Juan Barrundia took over on June 25, 1829.

Presidency

Acting presidency, 1829
After overthrowing the previous government of President Arce, Morazán ran the country dictatorially, until Barrundia took over on June 25, 1829.

First term, 1830–34

Francisco Morazán won the popular vote of the 1830 presidential election, against the conservative challenger José del Valle. He was inaugurated on September 16. In his inaugural speech he declared: "The sovereign people send me, to place myself, in the most dangerous of their destinies. I must obey and fulfill, the solemn oath that I have just rendered. I offer, to uphold the Federal Constitution, which I defended as a soldier and as a citizen."

With Morazán's as president and governors sponsored by him, the liberals had consolidated power. The General was now in position to advance his liberal reforms. Through them, he attempted to dismantle what he felt were archaic Spanish institutions, and to give to his people a society based upon general education, religious liberty and social and political equality. In 1831 Morazán and Governor Mariano Galvez turned Guatemala into a testing ground for these 'enlightenment-like' policies. They oversaw the building of schools and roads, enacted free trade policies, invited foreign capital and immigrants, allowed secular marriage and divorce and freedom of speech, tried to make public lands available to the expanding cochineal economy, separated church from state, abolished tithes, proclaimed religious liberties, confiscated church property, suppressed religious orders, and removed education from church control, among other policies.

All of this new approved legislation struck a blow  at the heart of the Guatemalan oligarchy. But more importantly, it stripped the Spanish clergy of their privileges, and curtailed their power. According to historian Mary Wilhelmine Williams: "The immediate reasons for the different enactments varied. Some laws were intended to protect the state from the clergy ... others aimed to help the recoup the public treasure, and at the same time sweep away aristocratic privilege; while still other legislation – especially that of latter date – was enacted for the punishment of opposition to earlier acts and of intrigues against the government" when Francisco Morazán first came to power. Back then, the General had to expel from the country archbishop Ramon Casaus and certain members of the monastic orders, because they were under suspicion of opposing independence. They used their influence against him and the Liberal Party during the civil war. They also had opposed the reforms, particularly those in the interest of general education which the Liberals were determined to push.

In March 1832, another conflict erupted in El Salvador. Chief of State, José María Cornejo had rebelled against some federal decrees, which prompted President Morazán to act. The commander in chief at the head of the Federal Troops marched on to El Salvador where they beat Cornejo's State Army on March 14. On the 28 of the same month, Morazán had occupied San Salvador. From that point forward, rumors about the need to reform the constitution began.

Second term, 1834–38 
In 1834 at the request of Governor, Mariano Galvez, the General moved the capital city to Sonsonate and later to San Salvador. The same year, the first four years of Francisco Morazán's presidency had ended. According to the constitution, elections needed to be held in order to elect the next president of the Republic. Moderate, José Cecilio del Valle ran against the incumbent president; for this reason, General Francisco Morazán deposited the presidency on General Gregorio Salazar, so the federal congress could verify the fairness of the election.

When all the votes were counted, José del Valle had defeated Francisco Morazán. The Federal elections showed strong popular opposition to liberal reforms. Valle, however, died before taking office. Most historians agree that had he lived, he might have brought conciliation and harmony between the opposing forces (Liberals and Conservatives). On June 2, the Federal Congress called for new elections, which were won by Francisco Morazán. On February 14, 1835. General Morazán, was sworn as president for a second term.

End of the federation 

In February 1837 there occurred in Central America a series of events that ignited a revolution that culminated with the fall of the Federation. An epidemic of cholera scourged Guatemala leaving approximately 1000 people dead and 3000 infected with the bacteria. The epidemic struck especially the poor and the Indians in the highlands of the state. At the time when it appeared, the Indians of the district of Mita, influenced by their priests, were much perturbed over the system of trial by jury (incomprehensible to them) which was being introduced. The disease spread rapidly and the government of Mariano Galvez, hoping to alleviate the situation, dispatched the available physicians, medical students and remedies for distribution. But these measures were of little help because the Indians continued to die.

The church viewed this as an opportunity to strike back at the liberal government of Mariano Galvez. The local priests spread the rumor that the government had poisoned the rivers and streams for the purpose of wiping out the indigenous population, and repopulating it with foreigners. In proof, they pointed to a recent grant of territory in Vera Paz made to a British colonization company. A cry was then raised by the frantic Indians against their supposed murderers. As the cholera continued to spread the Indians took to arms, killed whites and liberals, burned their houses, and prepared to confront Galvez's government.

The governor sent an army to try to stop the revolt. But the army's measures were so repressive, that it only made matters worse. By June Santa Rosa erupted, and from the village of Mataquescuintla emerged a young Rafael Carrera. Carrera was an illiterate, but shrewd and charismatic swineherd turned highwayman, whom the rebels wanted as their leader. The priests proclaimed to the natives that he was their protecting angel Rafael, descended from the heavens to take vengeance on the heretics, Liberals and foreigners and to restore their ancient dominion. They devised various tricks to favor the delusion, which were heralded as miracles. A letter was let down from the roof of one of the churches, in the midst of a vast congregation of Indians, which was supposed to come from the Virgin Mary, commissioning Carrera to lead a revolt against the government.

Under cries of "Long live religion!", and "Death to foreigners!", Carrera and his forces initiated a war against the government. Encouraged by these events the conservatives joined in. The liberal government called General Morazán for help. Francisco Morazán repeatedly defeated Carrera's forces and pacified the state, but he could never catch the Indian leader, as he simply retreated to the mountains and came back to re-occupy the key positions as soon as Morazán's troops left.

By 1838 Morazán was presiding over a dying institution. Galvez had relinquished power, Congress tried to restore some life to the Federal Government by transferring control of their custom revenues. But Honduras, Nicaragua and Costa Rica opposed this move and used it as an opportunity to leave the union. The Federation was dead. On February 1, 1839, Morazán had completed his second constitutional term as president, congress had dissolved and there was no legal basis to name his successor. In the end a failure at compromise, the power of the church, bitter infighting between conservatives and liberals, and the quest for personal glory were the main reasons for the downfall of the 'Federation'.

Chief of state 

After Francisco Morazán's second term as President of the Federal Republic ended, he was  left without political or military power. On July 13, 1839, however, the general was elected Chief of State of El Salvador.
When Rafael Carrera and the Guatemalan conservatives learned about Morazán's new role, they declared war on El Salvador. Francisco Morazán personified the 'Old Federation' itself and for that reason alone they vowed to defeat him. On July 24, Guatemala and Nicaragua signed a treaty of alliance against Morazán's government. Carrera called on the Salvadoran people to rise against their government. These calls resulted in small uprisings within El Salvador, but these were quickly put down without much effort by Morazán.

When Carrera's attempt failed, Morazán's enemies formed an army of Nicaraguan and Honduran troops. On September 25, 1839, these forces invaded El Salvador and faced Morazán's army during the battle of San Pedro Perulapán. The general only needed 600 Salvadorans to defeat 2,000 men commanded by generals Francisco Ferrera, Nicolás de Espinosa, and Manuel Quijano. After their defeat, the humiliated generals and their troops fled to neighboring states, leaving behind over three hundred dead.

Defeat
On March 18, 1840 Morazán made a last attempt to restore the 'Union'. He gathered what he thought were enough Salvadoran forces to face Carrera, and with them marched to Guatemala. Once positioned, Morazán moved in from the south, striking towards the capital. Carrera pulled most of his own force out of the capital, leaving only a small, very visible garrison inside. Morazán jumped in, slaughtered much of the bait, then found himself assaulted from all directions by Carrera's main force of about 5,000 men.

The battle became notorious for its savagery and revealed the ruthless side of Carrera. whose Indians sang Salve Regina, and shouted "Long Live Carrera!", "Death to Morazán!"  By the next morning, Morazán was running out of ammunition. He then ordered an increase in fire from three corners of the plaza, in order to attract attention, while he himself slipped out through the fourth corner of the plaza with a small escort, to escape back to El Salvador.

This time, the general did not have the support he needed from the common people, as he had had in 1830. The 'Liberal reforms' had not produced enough results for the citizenry; moreover, they resented some of these reforms. This was the case with the Livingston Code, which changed the system of taxation, among other reforms. As for the 'Liberals', they were too busy fighting among themselves that even former liberal president, José Francisco Barrundia had joined Rafael Carrera. Morazán's defeat was so decisive that on March 27, he deposited the headquarters of the State in the hands of director José Antonio Canas and directed a proclamation to the people of El Salvador. Morazán did not want to cause any more problems for the Salvadorans. With Francisco Morazán's final defeat, the hopes of a Central American federation vanished.

Exile in South America

On April 8, 1840, General Francisco Morazán went into exile. He left from the port of La Libertad in El Salvador, and embarked on the schooner Izalco accompanied by 30 of his closest friends and war veterans. He stopped in Costa Rica where he sought and obtained political asylum for most of his companions. Seven continued on the journey to South America with him. Morazán landed at Chiriquí Province, then moved on to David, Chiriquí where his family awaited him. While in David, Morazán was informed by his friends of the fierce persecutions suffered by his supporters at the hands of Rafael Carrea and other Central American leaders. Outraged by this and by the chain of insults and slander against him by some members of the press, he wrote and published his famous 'Manifest of David' dated July 16, 1841.

While he was still in David, Morazán also received calls from his liberal colleagues in Costa Rica. Braulio Carrillo, governor of that state, had restricted individual liberties, placed limits on freedom of the press, and derogated the Political Constitution of 1825. He replaced it with a new constitutional charter, denominated "Law of Bases and Guarantees", where he declared himself 'Chief of State for Life'. Furthermore, Carrillo declared Costa Rica a free and independent state. However, Morazán wanted to stay away from Central America affairs, and travelled to Peru. Once in Lima, he received the invitation of Mariscal Agustín Gamarra to command a Peruvian division, at a time when his country was at war with Chile. But Morazán declined, because he found this war very confusing and troubling. Peru, Bolivia, Colombia and Chile were all involved in a twelve-year war, which brought about a train of baneful stages of chaos, among all countries involved.

In Peru, Morazán was fortunate to find good friends with whom he shared the same ideals. These included Generals José Rufino Echenique and Pedro Bermudez. Around 1841, the English began to intervene in the Mosquito territory, located between Honduras and Nicaragua.  This intervention prompted Morazán to end his self-imposed Peruvian exile, and he decided that it was time to return to Central America. With the financial backing of General Pedro Bermudez, he departed from Callao on board the "Crusader" in late December 1841. On that trip he was accompanied by General Cabañas and Saravia, and five other officers. He and his companions made stops in Guayaquil, Ecuador and Chiriqui where he met with his family before returning to Central America.

Return

On January 15, 1842, Morazán arrived in El Salvador. He made himself available to the Central American leaders for the common defense against the British intervention. On February 16, 1842, he told his countrymen that his return was a "duty" and an "irresistible national sentiment", not only for him but for all "those who have a heart for their homeland." But his offers were rejected, nonetheless.

After this episode, he put forth a plan to overthrow Costa Rican head of State Braulio Carrillo.  Carrillo,  a reformer responsible for the expansion of coffee production in Costa Rica, had taken the first steps towards ending Costa Rica's political links with Central America.

In La Union, El Salvador, Morazán hired three boats. He then travelled to Acajutla, San Salvador and Sonsonate where he was able to reactivate the local forces. From Acajutla, he left for the island of Martin Perez, located on the Gulf of Fonseca. There he organized a military contingent of about 500 men. On April 7 and without any mishap, Morazán's fleet of five vessels landed at Port of Caldera in Costa Rica.

When Braulio Carrillo was informed of the presence of Morazán in Costa Rica, he organized a military force under the command of General Vicente Villasenor. On April 9, 1842, Morazán issued a proclamation to the people of Costa Rica in which he stated that he was never indifferent to the "misfortunes" of the Costa Rican people. "Your cries", he said, "have for a long time hurt my ears, and I finally found the means to save you, even at the expense of my own life".

Morazán avoided an armed confrontation with the forces sent by Carrillo. Through negotiations, in which he offered Villaseñor higher positions onces the Federation was restored, he got him to betray his government.  They signed  "The Jocote Accord". This agreement provided for the integration of a single military body, the convening of a National Constituent Assembly, the ousting of Braulio Carrillo and other members of his administration, and the installation of a provisional government under the command of Francisco Morazán. On April 13, 1842, Morazán's forces entered the city of San José.

Thereafter Chief Carrillo was forced to accept the treaty. He approved it only when some modifications were added. He then turned the government over to Morazán and left the country. Morazán's first act was to open the doors of the state to Costa Rican and Central American political refugees. He then abolished the laws that Carrillo had imposed limiting trade and property, restored individual and political rights, devoted himself to urgent reforms, and convened the Constituent Assembly, which appointed him Supreme Chief of the Costa Rican State.

According to historian Gomez Carrillo, in the months that followed, Morazán concentrated on recruiting military personnel for the purpose of 'restoring the Central America motherland.' Thereafter, rumors of the possibility of war against the neighboring states spread. This troubled Costa Ricans; they feared Rafael Carrera would intervene in their affairs, specially after Guatemala broke ties with them. In addition they felt financially incapable of sustaining a war, and also considered it unnecessary. After all, the restoration of the 'Union' was a cause they didn't believe in. For all these reasons they decided to conspire against Morazán.

Death

On September 11, 1842, a popular movement opposed to Morazán erupted in San José. Led by Portuguese General Antonio Pinto Soares, 400 men attacked Morazán's guard of 40 Salvadorans. Morazán and his men managed to repel the attacks and retreat to their headquarters. The fighting continued bloody and relentless, and the insurgents increased to 1,000, while the number of the besieged diminished. Chaplain José Castro then proposed a capitulation to Morazán ensuring his life, but he refused. After 88 hours of fighting, Morazán and his closest collaborators resolved to break the siege. General José Cabañas with 30 men held the retreat, which made it possible for the others to flee towards Cartago.

But the insurrection had spread there too, so Morazán turned for help to his friend, Pedro Mayorga. But Mayorga betrayed him, and turned him over to his enemies along with generals, Vicente Villaseñor, José Saravia and José Trinidad Cabañas. Saravia committed suicide, Villaseñor attempted the same but survived. Subsequently, Morazán and Vicente Villaseñor were sentenced to death. On September 15, Morazán and Villaseñor were transferred to the central plaza in San José.

Before his execution, Morazán dictated his famous will to his son, Francisco. In it, he calls his death "murder" and declares, "I do not have enemies, nor the smaller resentment I take to the grave against my murderers, I forgive them and wish them the greatest good." When he was done, a chair was offered to him but he refused it. Seated next to him was Gen. Villaseñor, sedated and almost unconscious. Morazán then said, "Dear friend, posterity will do us justice" and crossed himself. A few minutes later, Morazán himself commanded the firing squad that ended his life and that of Villaseñor.

With his death, the nation lost a man described by José Martí as "a powerful genius, a strategist, a speaker, a true statesman, perhaps the only one Central America has ever produced". In 1848, the government of José María Castro sent Morazán's remains to El Salvador, fulfilling one of his last wishes.

Politics and the failed Federation
More than a man of ideas, Morazán was a man of action wrote biographer Rafael Eliodoro Valle. But his name cannot fail to brighten the history of ideas in Central America, because he knew how to instill in them; the power of his sincerity,  the passion that inflamed him, and his faith in the future, like men of vision who always think big. Francisco Morazán pushed with his liberal and progressive ideas a series of revolutionary measures for the time. Thus, promoting education, immigration, established freedom of worship and the press. The first federal administration headed by Morazán was oriented to the peaceful reconstruction of the several States that comprised the republic.

When liberalism seemed to finally find the opportunity to implement its noblest principles, after a long process of integration as ideological tendency, as a political group and as a power option, the liberal regime was unable to achieve cohesion within the Central American society. The Liberals' sustained fight against the aristocracy and their quest to exclude conservatives from political life was not accompanied by a parallel effort to integrate other sectors such as indigenous people, (The bulk of the population) to the national modern project that they so vehemently postulated. The indigenous people never found the liberal proposal to be attractive enough, so as to break free from the deep rooted ancient order taught by the Church and the stability they have had for three centuries under the colonial regime.

According to writer, David Alejandro Luna, one of Morazán's biggest mistakes was to not design a plan to break the feudal estates where his secular enemies were sitting ... Morazán's fight was marred of romanticism, his strategic line tended to politically displace the oppressive aristocratic landowners of Central America, his tactics, however, disagreed with the political reality. Despite the strenuous efforts made by General Francisco Morazán from the presidency of the Republic. The clerical and aristocratic forces staged a strong anti-liberal building block taking advantage of the fanaticism and discontent that permeated large sections of the population, especially in the state of Guatemala.

Legacy

Francisco Morazán became a martyr and a symbol of the Republic of Central America. He gave his life however unsuccessfully, attempting to preserve the 'Union'. Now, more than 160 years after his death, Central America is still plagued by power struggles, corruption, and poverty. More often than not, the five republics have emulated Carrera than Morazán; but the dream of The Great Central American Country is still alive. His image can be found in bills, logos, and stamps. Institutions, cities, departments, schools, and parks among other things bear Morazán's name, in order to preserve his legacy.

El Salvador was among the first countries to pay tribute to Morazán. On March 14, 1887. The National Assembly of the Republic of El Salvador replaced the name of the department of "Gotera" with "Morazán". So as "to perpetuate the name of the great leader of the Central American Union". In 1943, Honduras renamed the Tegucigalpa department, Francisco Morazán. On November 15, 1887, the town of Tocoy Tzimá became 'Morazán' in Guatemala. In 1945, Port Morazán was founded in Nicaragua.

Costa Rica, the country that he invaded and where he died honored him with a park in the center of its capital San Jose.  

In the political field the idea of integration is still preserved in the mind of many Central Americans. For example; the Central American Parliament, also known by the abbreviation "Parlacen" (from the Spanish Parlamento Centroamericano). This  is a political institution devoted to the integration of the Central American countries. The Parlacen represents a modern version of the historic Federal Republic of Central America, though not including Costa Rica but it does include the Dominican Republic.  Panama used to be a member but left during the government of President Martinelli.
In the past several unsuccessful attempts have been made to restore the 'Union' (1851, 1886, 1921)

Morazán's legacy is also present in the arts. The first play of record in El Salvador is titled "La Tragedy of Morazán" written by Francisco Díaz (1812–45) and dramatizing the life of the Central American president. The modern period of in Honduran theater began with Luis Andrés Zúñiga Portillo when he wrote "Los Conspiradores" (The Conspirators, 1916), a historic drama that honored the virtues of Francisco Morazán. In his book Canto General, Pablo Neruda also pays tribute to the 'Liberal Caudillo', with a poem to Central America.

Statues and busts of Francisco Morazán can be found in Chile, El Salvador, United States, Spain, and elsewhere.  The most famous and controversial is the equestrian statue of Morazán located in Tegucigalpa's Central Park.

In the 1971 book Open Veins of Latin America, Uruguayan writer Eduardo Galeano mentions that this statue is that of French Marshal Michel Ney. According to Galeano, the statue was bought at a flea market, because the persons entrusted to buy it, spent the money in binges.  Galeano later retracted.  The story was also mentioned by Gabriel García Márquez in his 1982 Nobel Prize acceptance speech.  Research by scholar Rafael Leiva Vivas debunked this tale, showing that the statue was contracted for, that French sculptor Léopold Morice's name appears on the base, and that sculptor and architect Francisco Durini was also involved (either as collaborator or intermediary).

The movie Morazán (2017), Honduras' very first submission to the Academy Awards (Foreign Language Film), depicts Morazán's last days.

A species of Honduran lizard, Anolis morazani, is named in his honor.

References

Further reading

Biographies

Related history

External links 

Exhibition: See Sword, Portraits, and Objects  that Belonged to Morazán  
Proyecto Casa de Morazán
José Francisco Morazán Quezada 2003
Character of General Morazán

1792 births
1842 deaths
People from Tegucigalpa
Presidents of Honduras
Presidents of El Salvador
Heads of state of the Federal Republic of Central America
Presidents of Costa Rica
19th-century Costa Rican people
Rafael Carrera
Executed presidents
People executed by Costa Rica by firing squad
Executed Honduran people
Burials in El Salvador